Milton Jawaun Williams (born April 6, 1999) is an American football defensive tackle for the Philadelphia Eagles of the National Football League (NFL). He played college football at Louisiana Tech and was drafted by the Eagles in the third round of the 2021 NFL Draft.

Early years
Williams attended Crowley High School in Crowley, Texas. During his career, he had 300 tackles, 22 sacks and scored four touchdowns. He committed to Louisiana Tech University to play college football.

College career
Williams played at Louisiana Tech from 2017 to 2020. After redshirting his first year in 2017, he played in seven games as a backup in 2018. As a sophomore in 2019, he became a starter. He finished his career with 108 tackles and 10.5 sacks. After the 2020 season, he announced that he was forgoing his senior season and entering the 2021 NFL Draft.

Professional career

Williams was selected by the Philadelphia Eagles in the third round (73rd overall) of the 2021 NFL Draft. On June 3, 2021, Williams signed his four-year rookie contract with the Eagles. On October 31 Williams recorded his first ever sack on Jared Goff to go along with a career high 4 tackles during a 44-6 victory. In 2022, the Eagles reached Super Bowl LVII. In the Super Bowl, Williams recorded 1 tackle but the Eagles lost 38-35 to the Kansas City Chiefs.

References

External links
Louisiana Tech Bulldogs bio

1999 births
Living people
People from Crowley, Texas
Players of American football from Texas
Sportspeople from the Dallas–Fort Worth metroplex
American football defensive tackles
American football defensive ends
Louisiana Tech Bulldogs football players
Philadelphia Eagles players